The inferior sagittal sinus (also known as inferior longitudinal sinus), within the human head, is an area beneath the brain which allows blood to drain outwards posteriorly from the center of the head. It drains (from the center of the brain) to the straight sinus (at the back of the head), which connects to the transverse sinuses.  See diagram (at right): labeled in the brain as "" (for Latin: sinus sagittalis inferior).

The inferior sagittal sinus courses along the inferior border of the falx cerebri, superior to the corpus callosum.

It receives blood from the deep and medial aspects of the cerebral hemispheres and drains into the straight sinus.

Additional images

See also
 Dural venous sinuses
 Occipital sinus
 Superficial veins of the brain

References
 

Veins of the head and neck